The men's national association football teams of Vietnam and the United Arab Emirates played a match on 8 July 2007 as part of the 2007 AFC Asian Cup. The game marked the debut of a united Vietnamese national football team at continental level. Previously, only South Vietnam had played in competitive tournaments. Vietnam qualified for the tournament as one of four co-hosts of the 2007 Asian Cup, along with Indonesia, Malaysia and Thailand.

In the UAE as well as the Arab world, the match was dubbed the Disaster of Hanoi, as the UAE suffered a denting loss to a much weaker and less developed host nation. Meanwhile in Vietnam, the match has been significant due to its influence on the future development of Vietnamese football and is remembered as the Miracle of Hanoi. The match has been very deep-rooted in Vietnamese society and is still often used by Vietnamese fans and press to cheer themselves against opponents from the Middle East.

Background
Initially, Vietnam was split into two national teams: North Vietnam and South Vietnam. As a member of both the AFC and FIFA, South Vietnam played at the first two editions of the AFC Asian Cup in 1956 and 1960. North Vietnam on the other hand was not an AFC or FIFA member and as a result did not play in any international tournaments.

The Vietnam War, along with subsequent conflicts after 1975 against the Khmer Rouge and China, resulted in a crippling economic downturn. Football development was severely stunted as a result of these wars, as well as international sanctions and isolation. However, economic reforms in 1986 marked Vietnam's return to the international stage and their reappearance in international football.

The United Arab Emirates first appeared at an Asian Cup in 1980. The team later qualified for the 1990 FIFA World Cup, their only World Cup to date. The Emiratis went on to become runners-up of the 1996 AFC Asian Cup on home soil and qualified for the 1997 FIFA Confederations Cup, their second FIFA tournament. By the time they qualified for the 2007 Asian Cup, they were led by Frenchman Bruno Metsu, who helped Senegal reach the quarter-finals in their maiden 2002 FIFA World Cup. He led the UAE to win the 2007 Gulf Cup of Nations, again on home soil.

The UAE was believed to be the better team leading up to the match and even with Vietnam being the hosts, there were little expectations that Vietnam could win.

Pre-match

Vietnam
Vietnam was regarded as an unskilled and uncoordinated team and had a below-average performance in the 2006 World Cup qualification phase, finishing third in their group with a record of 1-1-4. Vietnam's performance had also suffered criticism at the 2007 AFF Championship, when they were eliminated in the semi-finals by Thailand following a 0-2 defeat at home and a 0-0 away draw. Due to these disappointing performances, coach Alfred Riedl said he had low expectations. Vietnam were drawn against three previous champions in its group: defending champions Japan, 2006 Asian Games champion Qatar and Gulf Cup champions the UAE. To make matters worse, Vietnam was the lowest-ranked team to be seeded in the competition, ranking 172 at the time.

To prepare for the competition, Vietnam played two friendlies against Jamaica and Bahrain, with the latter sharing common cultural ties with the United Arab Emirates and finished fourth at the previous Asian Cup. Vietnam managed to beat Jamaica 3–0 before creating a goal fever in a 5–3 win against the latter.

United Arab Emirates
The UAE suffered an injury crisis leading up to the tournament, but they was expected to win this match anyway. The UAE, having just won the Gulf Cup the same year, had several top stars in their squad, notably Ismail Matar, Amer Mubarak and Faisal Khalil. They were also led by Frenchman Bruno Metsu, who led Senegal to the quarter-finals of the 2002 FIFA World Cup. Moreover, the UAE also had the upper hand in the FIFA rankings, ranking 87th at the time.

Match

Summary

First half
Vietnam and the UAE opened the Group B matches under the supervision of Lebanese referee Talaat Najm. The UAE started strongly, pressuring the Vietnamese defense in the opening minutes. Vietnam was cheered on by a majority of home fans, but the UAE dominated the opening minutes, demonstrating their skill and experience. Despite this, Vietnam had several chances, but poor-quality finishing lead to them scoring no goals. The UAE controlled possession and managed to create several promising chances, but also didn't score.

The Vietnamese players' discipline helped keep the score heading into half time at 0-0. Vietnam's goalkeeper, Dương Hồng Sơn, played a key role in keeping the score level in the first half.

Second half
The early stages of the second half were again dominated by the UAE team. Despite missing several opportunities, the UAE side kept focusing on the offensive, leaving them vulnerable to Vietnam counterattacks.

When the ball was passed from the Emirati defence to Ismail Matar, Huỳnh Quang Thanh intercepted the ball. Thanh passed it to Nguyễn Minh Phương before making a run into the penalty area of the UAE. Majed Naser, slow to react to Phương's run, allowed a decisive strike by Thanh to give Vietnam a 1–0 lead in the 64th minute. This came as a complete surprise to the supporters in the stadium, as this was expected to be a routine victory for the UAE.

Faisal Khalil had a chance to equalize for the UAE, but failed to finish. Following which, Vietnam took advantage of the opposing team committing men forward and launched a counter-attack. However, Phùng Văn Nhiên was too slow in his decision-making and the ball was quickly reclaimed by Rashid Abdulrahman, who then passed to Matar. Matar shot directly to the foot of Vietnam's goalkeeper and the ball was sent towards Minh Phương. He then made a long pass through to Lê Công Vinh, who shot the ball over Naser's head in the 73rd minute, giving Vietnam a 2-0 lead.

The Emiratis attacked all-out during the final minutes to no avail. Vietnam ended the match victorious with a score of 2–0 and creating the biggest shock in the tournament's opening days. For the UAE, the loss had a disastrous consequence on their campaign and for Vietnam, their shock victory over one of Asia's best teams at the time helped establish them as a competent nation in football.

Details

Aftermath
Vietnam's victory over the UAE was considered one of the biggest upsets of the tournament. Before the tournament, Vietnam was expected to make an early exit given their lowest-ranking position in the tournament, while the UAE was expected to advance to the later stages.

It also had a significant consequence for the tournament and sparked a surge of surprise upsets in the Asian Cup, including Iraq's shock 3–1 win over Australia and Bahrain's 2–1 victory over South Korea. Although they lost 4–1 to a much more powerful Japan, Vietnam successfully booked their ticket to the quarter-finals, at which they were beaten by eventual champions Iraq. They were the only team to advance out of the four host nations and one of three to win a match at all. The tournament was seen as a renaissance of football in the country.

For the UAE, their defeat had a noticeable impact on the team's confidence. They were beaten 3–1 by Japan and their 2–1 win over neighbours Qatar did little to help them. Ironically, their victory helped Vietnam advance to the next round.

After the tournament, the UAE's performance continued to fall. Their participation at the next tournament in Qatar was even more disastrous when one of their players scored two own goals in two matches. The team ended up last in their group, behind Iran, Iraq and even underdogs North Korea. By the 2015 AFC Asian Cup, they had improved their performances and finished third.

Both Vietnam and the UAE qualified for the 2019 AFC Asian Cup, with the latter hosting this edition of the tournament. Vietnam reached the quarter-finals despite being in the same group with Asian powerhouses and former Asian Cup champions Iran and Iraq. They also managed to overcome two Middle Eastern sides, Yemen and Jordan, both of whom share common cultural ties to the UAE. Meanwhile, the UAE managed to reach the semi-finals for the second consecutive time, but failed to defeat eventual champions Qatar in a disappointing 0–4 loss.

See also
2007 AFC Asian Cup
Vietnam national football team
United Arab Emirates national football team

References

2007 AFC Asian Cup
AFC Asian Cup matches
Vietnam national football team matches
United Arab Emirates national football team matches
July 2007 sports events in Asia
Sport in Hanoi
21st century in Hanoi